Serbian may refer to:

 someone or something related to Serbia, a country in Southeastern Europe
 someone or something related to the Serbs, a South Slavic people
 Serbian language
 Serbian names

See also
 
 
 Old Serbian (disambiguation)
 Serbians
 Serbia (disambiguation)
 Names of the Serbs and Serbia

Language and nationality disambiguation pages